Valev (Bulgarian: Вълев) is a Bulgarian masculine surname, its feminine counterpart is Valeva. It may refer to

Anna Valev (born 1969), Swedish ballet dancer
Marko Valev (born 1969), Bulgarian judoka 
Nikolay Valev (born 1980), Bulgarian football forward 
Silvia Valeva, fictional character from Undercover (Bulgarian TV series)
Stefan Valev (1935–2009), Bulgarian graphic and industrial designer

See also
 Vale (surname)
 Valek (surname)
 Vales (surname)

Bulgarian-language surnames